"Jagged Edge of a Broken Heart" is a song written by Walker Igleheart and Mike Joyce. It was originally recorded and released as a single by American country artist Gail Davies.

The song was originally recorded in June 1984 at the "Emerald Sound Studio", located in Nashville, Tennessee, United States. The session was co-produced by Davies and Leland Sklar. Released as a single of September 1984, "Jagged Edge of a Broken Heart" peaked in the twentieth position on the Billboard Magazine Hot Country Singles & Tracks chart. It became her eleventh top-twenty single on the latter chart. In addition, the single peaked within the top-forty on the Canadian RPM Country Tracks chart.

According to Davies' autobiography The Last of the Outlaws, "Jagged Edge of a Broken Heart" was played by radio as if it had been a top-five hit on the Billboard country chart. However, the single only reached the top-twenty.

In 2001, the song was covered by the Russian country band Bering Strait.

Chart performance

References 

1984 songs
1984 singles
Gail Davies songs
Song recordings produced by Gail Davies
RCA Records singles